Sharpei could refer to:

 The dog breed Shar Pei
 Iberian green woodpecker (Picus sharpei)
 Sharpe's longclaw (Hemimacronyx sharpei)